Krompachy is a town in Slovakia, with a rich mining and metallurgical history, well-known both in Slovakia and in its close neighboring countries for its Plejsy ski center.

History 
The town was first mentioned in 1282 in a charter by king Ladislaus IV as belonging to the domain of Spiš Castle. The town's name derives from German (krumm Bach - crooked stream), as the town was settled by German colonists.

From then onwards, it was a centre of mining and metallurgy until the end of the 20th century, particularly focussed on the iron and copper industries. At the start of the 20th century, the Krompachy Ironworks (Krompašská železiareň) had around 3,500 employees and was the biggest ironworks of its time in the Kingdom of Hungary. The Ironworks closed after World War I.

In 1921, there was a bloody uprising, known as the Krompachy Uprising in the town.

Since 1991, following the industrial decline and as a result of large scale investment, Plejsy became an internationally visited alpine ski centre and became known as a holiday destination.

Tourism 
As well as the skiing centre at Plejsy, Krompachy is known for its scenery of hills, valleys and fields. This, together with a number of local natural and cultural sites, have made the town a year-round tourist destination.

Sites 
 Roman Catholic church of Evangelic Saint John, built in the classical style from 1774
 17th century baroque curia reconstructed into a private hotel
 Krompachy Uprising monument (see below)
 The administrative building of the former ironworks
 Eastern Slovakia's first water plant

Geography 

The rainiest month is July and the driest is February. Snow covers the area 75–90 days a year.

The large conifer and mixed forests are home of red deer, boars, wolves, lynxes, badgers. The forests are rich in mushrooms and wild forest fruits. The Hornád river is the home of trout, salmon, grayling and eel.

Population 
According to the latest census in 2001, Krompachy has a population of 8,812 people. 7,679 are of Slovak nationality, 736 are of Romani nationality and 49 of its inhabitants are of Czech nationality.

In terms of religion, 91% of the population are Roman Catholics, 4% Orthodox, 3% Greek Catholics and 2% are Lutherans.

Economy 
The town's mainly industrial character is the result of the terrain. Matsushita, a producer of Panasonic goods, is the biggest company in the region, which also is the location of the Slovak Electrotechnical Company factory that produces a wide range of machines for industrial and domestic use.

There are still some iron and copper industrials active in the area such as Zlieváreň SEZ Krompachy a foundry that produces cast iron parts for industrial and domestic use.

Healthcare 
Krompachy has a hospital with the following departments: surgery, emergency, gynecology and obstetrics, internal, as well as dermatology. There are six non-state healthcare institutions in the town, which together with two drug stores provide complete healthcare services.

Education and Culture 
The town has three elementary schools, an elementary school of art, and a specialised elementary school. The town's leisure time center helps children and teenagers to spend their leisure time in a good way by organizing of different interest clubs. The town is the home to a secondary grammar school and an apprentice-training center of electrical engineering. The center of cultural events is the municipal cultural center, part of which is a brass ensemble with a 90 years tradition, the Workers chorus and Krompašan and Krompašánek folk troops. One of the four majorette groups is internationally acknowledged. The center is the residence of the town library with its 29,000 titles. The Cantica Christiana mixed choir is part of the Roman Catholic Church.

Sport 
The Town Sport Club is the place of sport events. This center gathers the table tennis, karate, cycloturist, WPEU, ice hockey, and triathlon-duathlon-marathon groups. The Football club having 3rd league ambitions and the Basketball club after its 1st league performance are active too.
For athletes the following sites are available: Plejsy ski center, football stadium on SNP Street, gymnasium and swimming pool on Maurerova Street, tennis court on Trangusova Street, natural ice rink on SNP Street, as well a multi-function table tennis court on the area of the secondary grammar school and the IN-LINE park.

Twin towns — sister cities

Krompachy is twinned with:

 Békéscsaba, Hungary 
 Gaszowice, Poland 
 Nădlac, Romania
 Ozimek, Poland 
 Rýmařov, Czech Republic

Notable people from Krompachy 
 Vavrinec Koch (1442–1475) humanist scientist, professor of the Universitas Istropolitana and Vienna University, philosopher and theologian
Július Gundlefinger (1833–1894) Spis and Šaris landscape painter, nobleman
Zeno Csaky (1840–1905) head of the Spis administration from 1896
Ľudovit Tetmajer (1850–1905) technician, inventor, university professor, and construction expert
Július Mauer (1896–1961) politician and prime minister
Tibor Honty (1907–1968) internationally renowned photographer
Jozef Fabini (1908–1984) painter and art historian
Július Barč-Ivan (1909–1953) dramatist, writer and publicist
 Mikuláš Šprinc (1914–1985) poet, founder of Catholic modernism, educationalist, writer, and translator
Ludwig Eisenberg (1916–2006) holocaust survivor
 Bartolomej Urbanec (1918–1983) composer, folklorist, conductor of SĽUK and Lúčnica orchestras
Jozef Hodorovský (1921-2005) actor and educationalist
 Ján Kvasnička (1927) professor, historian, chancellor of the Comenius University in Bratislava
 Ondrej Lenárd (1942) world-famous conductor, director of leading Slovak orchestras, conductor of the Tokio Shynsei Nippon Symphony Orchestra
 Milan Pazout (1948) olympian, world champion in all alpine ski disciplines

References

External links 
  
 Everything about table tennis in Krompachy

Cities and towns in Slovakia
Spiš